The Initial Command is the first full-length studio album released by Canadian industrial band Front Line Assembly, released in 1987 through Belgian label KK.

Release
Since the 1987 release of The Initial Command, the album has been re-issued several times. American label ROIR released the album in 1990 on cassette with a different cover. It was the first release of the album in the United States and the second Front Line Assembly album released by ROIR after the band's second album State of Mind. British label Third Mind followed in 1992 with a licensed CD version in the United States. Los Angeles-based Cleopatra's and German Zoth Ommog's release in 1997 contained two new tracks and new cover art. This re-release incorrectly listed the second track "Core" as "Intelligence Dream" while the liner notes have the correct title. "Complexity" and "Core" appear to be new songs at the time of release. Cleopatra re-issued a remastered version of the album on September 3, 2022 on vinyl and with the two bonus tracks on CD.

Production
The music was recorded on a 4-track tape.

Track listing

Personnel

Front Line Assembly
 Bill Leeb – production, engineering, vocals
 Michael Balch – production (1987 Release), mixing (1987 Release)
 Rhys Fulber (1987 Release 1, 3, 4)
 Chris Peterson – mixing (1997 Re-release 1, 2)

Technical personnel
 Carylann Loeppky – cover art (1987 Release)
 David Rosychuk – design (1987 Release), artwork (1987 Release)

References

Front Line Assembly albums
1987 debut albums
ROIR albums
Cleopatra Records albums
Zoth Ommog Records albums